Abu Sa'id Uthman Ibn Sa‘id al-Qutbi, better known as Warsh (110-197AH), was a significant figure in the history of Quranic recitation (qira'at), the canonical methods of reciting the Qur'an. Alongside Qalun, he was one of the two primary transmitters of the canonical reading method of Nafi‘ al-Madani. Together, their style is the most common form of Qur'anic recitation in the generality of African mosques outside of Egypt, and is also popular in Yemen and Darfur despite the rest of Sudan following the method of Hafs. The method of Warsh and his counterpart Qalun was also the most popular method of recitation in Al-Andalus. The majority of printed Mushafs today in North Africa and West Africa follow the reading of Warsh.

He died in 812CE.

Warsh recitation 

Warsh 'an Naafi' is one of the main canonical methods of reciting the Qur'an. The recitations of the Quran, known in Arabic as Qira'at, are conducted under the rules of the Tajwid Science. It is attributed to Imam Warsh who in turn got it from his teacher Nafi‘ al-Madani who was one of the transmitters of the seven recitations. The recitation of Warsh 'an Naafi' is one of two major recitation traditions. The second is Hafs 'an 'Asim.

History 
Imam Warsh (110-197AH) was born Uthman Ibn Sa‘id al-Qutbi in Egypt. He was called Warsh, a substance of milk, by his teacher Naafi' because he was light skinned. He learned his recitation from Naafi' at Medina. After finishing his education, he returned to Egypt where he became the senior reciter of the Quran.

In the 10th century, the Muslim scholar Ibn Mujāhid canonized the seven readings of the Quran including Warsh 'an Naafi'. However, only the transmission of Asim and Warsh remains influential. The Warsh 'an Naafi' recitation became widespread in North Africa, in large part because it was the preferred recitation of Imam Malik ibn Anas, whose Maliki school of jurisprudence predominated in that region of the world. In Medieval times, it was the main Quranic recitation in Islamic Iberia. The Warsh 'an Naafi' transmission represents the recitational tradition of Medina.

Comparison of Warsh and Hafs recitation 

The Warsh 'an Naafi' recitation of the Quran differs from Hafs 'an Asim in orthography. The majority of differences do not affect the meaning. Yet in some cases the differences change the implications of the verse. In verse 2:184 Hafs recites the verse to be "... a ransom [as substitute] of feeding a poor person...". On the other hand, Warsh reads it "... a ransom [as substitute] of feeding poor people..." Other variants that go beyond orthography include :

Another major difference between Hafs and Warsh recitation of the Quran is the pronunciation of the words. Modern Qurans have diacritical marks (known as Tashkil) and in some cases pronouncing the word differently could imply different meaning. Here are some examples:

See also

Ten readers and transmitters 
Nafi‘ al-Madani
Qalun
Warsh
Ibn Kathir al-Makki
Al-Bazzi
Qunbul
Abu 'Amr ibn al-'Ala'
Ad-Duri
Al-Susi
Ibn Amir ad-Dimashqi
Hisham ibn Ammar
Ibn Dhakwan
Aasim ibn Abi al-Najud
Shu'bah
Hafs
Hamzah az-Zaiyyat
Khalaf
Khallad
Al-Kisa'i
Al-Layth
Ad-Duri
Abu Ja'far
'Isa ibn Waddan
Ibn Jummaz
Ya'qub al-Yamani
Ruways
Rawh
Khalaf
Ishaq
Idris

:Fa:قرائت ورش از نافع

References 

812 deaths
Quran
Quranic readings
Warsh recitation